Kanwal may refer to:
 Kanwal, New South Wales, a suburb in Australia
 Kanwal, a personal name; notable people with the name include:
 Anita Kanwal, Indian actress and producer
 Jaswant Singh Kanwal, Indian Punjabi-language writer
 Kanwal Ameen, Pakistani academic
 Kanwal Bharti, Indian Hindi-language writer and columnist
 Kanwal Feroze, Pakistani writer
 Kanwal Jeet Singh Dhillon, Indian army officer
 Kanwal Nauman, Pakistani actor and politician
 Kanwal Naz, Pakistani cricketer
 Kanwal Pervaiz, Pakistani politician
 Kanwal Rekhi, Indian–American businessman
 Kanwal Shauzab, Pakistani politician
 Kanwal Sibal, Indian diplomat
 Kanwal Singh Chauhan, Indian farmer
 Kanwal Thakar Singh, Indian badminton player
 Kanwal Ziai, Indian Hindi/Urdu-language writer
 Pooja Kanwal, Indian actress
 Rahul Kanwal, Indian TV journalist
 Sadaf Kanwal, Pakistani actress and model
 Sandeela Kanwal, American victim of an honor killing